This is a list of the NCAA Division I men's basketball tournament regional championships by coach. The current names of the NCAA tournament regions are the East, Midwest, South, and West. The winners of the four regions are awarded an NCAA Regional Championship Trophy and advance in the Division I men's basketball tournament to play in the Final Four.

Final Four appearances by coach
 Coaches with vacated Final Four appearances due to NCAA violations are marked with an * next to the year. The listed Final Four totals for those coaches do not include the vacated appearances.
 Coaches with names in bold are active with a team that they took to a Final Four.
 Coaches with names in bold italics are active in NCAA Division I, but are not currently coaching a team that they took to a Final Four.
 Years in bold indicate national championship.
 All school names reflect current athletic brand names, which do not necessarily match those in use during a particular season.

Coaches whose only appearance has been vacated

Coaches with multiple NCAA Division I Championships
This is a list of NCAA men's basketball coaches who have won multiple championships. This list includes only championships since 1939 when the National Association of Basketball Coaches began the formal national championship tournament that would be taken over by the NCAA the following year.

*Rick Pitino and Louisville won the 2013 NCAA Championship but it was later vacated by the NCAA.

See also
 List of college men's basketball coaches with 600 wins

References
 2015 NCAA Record Book - Coaches

College men's basketball records and statistics in the United States
Coach